The discography of American R&B singer Keri Hilson consists of two studio albums, twenty-nine singles (including seventeen as a featured artist), and thirty-one music videos. Hilson began her career as a songwriter, penning tracks for several artists in the mid-2000s as part of the five-person production and songwriting team The Clutch. Together, they co-wrote songs for artists including Mary J. Blige, Omarion, The Pussycat Dolls and Britney Spears. Hilson's solo discography began when she was featured on "Hey Now (Mean Muggin)", a 2004 single by American rapper Xzibit, which reached the top 10 in the United Kingdom. In 2006, Hilson signed to Mosley Music Group, a record label created by American record producer and rapper Timbaland.

The following year, Hilson was featured on Timbaland's single "The Way I Are", which topped the charts around the world, including Australia, Germany, England Ireland, Norway and the United Kingdom. "Energy" was released as Hilson's debut single as a solo artist in May 2008. Her debut studio album In a Perfect World... was released in March 2009 and debuted at number four on the US Billboard 200 chart and number one on the US Top R&B/Hip-Hop Albums chart. The album was later certified gold by the Recording Industry Association of America (RIAA), for selling more than 500,000 copies. "Return the Favor", another collaboration with Timbaland, was released as the album's second single and reached the top 20 in Ireland and the United Kingdom, and the top 30 in Austria and Germany. Subsequent singles from the album include, "Turnin Me On" and "Knock You Down", the latter of which reached number three on the US Billboard Hot 100 chart and number one on the US Hot R&B/Hip-Hop Songs chart. Both songs received platinum certifications in the United States. A reissue of In a Perfect World... included the single "I Like", which reached number one in Germany and Slovakia, while charting within the top 10 in three other countries. Throughout 2009 and 2010, Hilson was featured on several singles by other artists, including "Number One" with R. Kelly, "Medicine" with Plies and "Got Your Back" with T.I.

Hilson's second studio album No Boys Allowed was released in December 2010 and debuted at number eleven on the US Billboard 200 chart and number seven on the US Top R&B/Hip-Hop Albums chart. The album's lead single "Breaking Point" only charted on the US Hot R&B/Hip-Hop Songs chart at number 44. "Pretty Girl Rock" was released as the album's second single and reached the top 20 in Germany and New Zealand, and the top 30 in the United States, Austria and Slovakia. The song received a platinum certification in the United States. "One Night Stand", featuring American singer Chris Brown, and "Lose Control (Let Me Down)", featuring American rapper Nelly, were released as the album's third and fourth singles, respectively.

Studio albums

Singles

As lead artist

As featured artist

Other charted songs

Other appearances

Soundtrack appearances

Album appearances

Music videos

Songwriting and production credits 
 indicates a song that was released as a single.

Notes

References

External links 

 

Discography
Discographies of American artists
Pop music discographies
Rhythm and blues discographies